Vietnam Television, or VTV, is the national television broadcaster of Vietnam. As the state broadcaster under the direction of the government of Vietnam, VTV is tasked with "propagating the views of the Party, policies, laws of the government".

History

VTV was established with technical assistance and training from Cuba on 7 September 1970, in Hanoi, as a department of Voice of Vietnam. During the Vietnam War it broadcast intermittently from a mountainous region.

After reunification in 1975, the former US-run stations in the south became part of the national network, and broadcasting was extended to the entire country.

Color television was experimented in 1977 and adopted the French SECAM standard and fully implemented in 1986. Vietnam Television became an official name on 30 April 1987. And by 1990, VTV viewers had two national TV channels to choose from as VTV2 was launched and that year switched to PAL.

VTV's regional broadcasting centres are located in Ho Chi Minh City, Huế, Da Nang, Nha Trang (formerly in Phú Yên), and Cần Thơ. Programming is relayed nationwide via a network of provincial and municipal television stations. There are transmitters in most outlying areas of the country. By 2003, more than 80% of all urban households owned a television set. The percentage was considerably less in rural areas, but even the most remote village cafe has a TV and video or DVD player.

In addition, each major city and most of the 51 provinces have their own television stations.

January 1–7, 2020: Perform SD & HD channel sync testing for all channels.

Between 19 March and 30 April 2020, as a safety precaution due to the COVID-19 pandemic in the country, Vietnam Television temporarily suspended the overnight timeslot on most channels, with the exception of VTV1, VTV4 and VTV7, and limited the broadcast time to 19 hours per day. The overnight timeslot returned to these channels as of 00:00, 1 May 2020.

From May 10, 2020, Decree 34/2020/ND-CP officially takes effect. Accordingly, VTV merged and restructured the station's editing, production and broadcasting units and Vietnam Television Centers in the Central and Southern regions.

From July 30 to September 2, 2020, during the time of social distancing to prevent the COVID-19 epidemic in central provinces and cities, VTV8 continues to shorten the broadcast time to 19 hours daily. From September 3, 2020, VTV8 has broadcast 24 hours daily again.

December 31, 2020: The station stopped broadcasting terrestrial analogue television in 15 provinces of group IV of the Terrestrial Television Digitization Scheme, completing the national television digitization.

On September 8, 2022, Decree No. 60/2022/ND-CP on the organization, tasks and powers of Vietnam Television was issued. Accordingly, the Youth Department is no longer part of the department system of Vietnam Television Station from October 1, 2022. At the same time, the Vietnam Television Center in the Southern region was split and re-established. Vietnam Television Center in Ho Chi Minh City as well as Vietnam Television Center in the Southwest region (on the basis of the Southwest Regional Office of Vietnam Television Center in the Southern region). The Vietnam Television Center in the Southwest region is responsible for producing programs for the VTV Can Tho television channel and other VTV channels.

October 10, 2022: VTV6 channel officially stopped broadcasting, piloting VTV Cần Thơ channel.

October 13, 2022: Officially broadcast the National Television Channel of the Southwest region - VTV Cần Thơ.

November 1, 2022: officially synchronized SD & HD channel streams for all channels (except for channels VTV5 Tây Nam Bộ, VTV8 and VTV Cần Thơ which have synchronized streams before)

On November 21, 2022, VTV Cần Thơ channel increases the broadcast time 24/7 daily, during the broadcast of programs related to the matches of the FIFA World Cup 2022 taking place in Qatar.

Channels
VTV now has the following channels:

 VTV1:  News and current affairs channel; 24/7. The channel also broadcasts live important national events and parliament meetings. Music and movies are the only fields that largely fall outside its format. VTV1 was initially broadcast on 7 September 1970. An HD version of VTV1 was launched on 31 March 2014. It is one of the seven must-carry national channels, and it must be carried free-to-air by all satellite and cable providers in Vietnam.
 VTV2: Science and education channel; broadcast 24/7. The channel also broadcasts Chinese, Thai, and South Korean TV series. VTV2 started transmission on 1 January 1990. An HD version of VTV2 was launched on 19 May 2015.
 VTV3: Sports and entertainment channel, broadcast 24/7. VTV3 officially launched on 31 March 1996. An HD version of VTV3 was launched on 31 March 2013. This is the first channel in VTV to broadcast in high-definition.
 VTV4: An international channel officially launched in 1998, offering a best-of package of programming from VTV's domestic channels to Vietnamese worldwide, also available in Taiwan CHT MOD Channel 215. An HD version of VTV4 was launched on 19 June 2015.
 VTV5: Ethnic language channel, broadcast 24/7. VTV5 launched on 10 February 2002. An HD version of VTV5 was launched on 1 July 2015.
 VTV5 Tây Nam Bộ: A bilingual Khmer-Vietnamese channel and first regional variation of VTV5, broadcast 24/7. VTV5 TNB and VTV5 TNB HD both launched on 1 January 2016. An HD version of VTV5 TNB was launched on 13 January 2021.
 VTV5 Tây Nguyên: Ethnic language channel in Central Highlands region of Vietnam and second regional variation of VTV5, broadcast 24/7. VTV5 TN was launched on 17 October 2016. An HD version of VTV5 TN was launched on 6 January 2018.
 VTV Cần Thơ: Specialized channel for viewers in the Southwest region of Vietnam, broadcast from 5:30 to 23:30. It was soft-launched on 10 October 2022 and began broadcasting officially from 13 October 2022.
 VTV7: Education and children channel, broadcast from 06:00 to 24:00. VTV7 and VTV7 HD both soft-launched from 20 November 2015 and began broadcasting officially on 1 January 2016.
 VTV8: Specialized channel for viewers in the Central and Central Highlands region of Vietnam, broadcast 24/7. VTV8 and VTV8 HD both launched on 1 January 2016.
 VTV9: Specialized channel for viewers in the Southeast region of Vietnam, launched on 8 October 2007. An HD version of VTV9 was launched on 28 August 2015.

Defunct regional channels
 VTV6: Youth and children channel that targets an audience between 18 and 34 years old and sporting events, broadcast 24/7. VTV6 started broadcasting on 29 April 2007. An HD version of VTV6 was launched on 7 September 2013. From October 10, 2022, this channel is replaced by VTV Cần Thơ.
VTV Huế
VTV Đà Nẵng
VTV Phú Yên
VTV Cần Thơ 1
VTV Cần Thơ 2

Since 2003, all the above channels are also available via satellite, digital terrestrial, and digital cable networks across Vietnam. The VTV itself offers 15 pay TV channels through satellite television and digital cable which are called K+ and VTVCab respectively,

Changes to VTV regional channels were made on 1 January 2016. VTV Huế, VTV Đà Nẵng, and VTV Phú Yên ceased programming and became VTV8, a specific channel for Central and Highland Regions of Vietnam. Both the old VTV9 (which was only for Ho Chi Minh City and Southeast Vietnam regions) and VTV Cần Thơ 1 (which was only for Cần Thơ City and Hậu Giang Province) merged to form the new VTV9 for both southeast and southwest of Vietnam, while VTV Cần Thơ 2 was renamed VTV5 Tây Nam Bộ, a bilingual Khmer-Vietnamese channel and the first regional variation of VTV5. On 17 October 2016, VTV5 Tây Nguyên, a channel for ethnic minorities in Central Highlands of Vietnam and another regional variation of VTV5, was also launched.

Future channels
 VTV5 Tây Bắc: Specialized channel for viewers in the Northwest of Vietnam, currently approved by the Government and will start broadcasting around 2023.

List of VTV channels

Programming
VTV has its own film production company, the Vietnam Television Film Centre (formerly Vietnam Television Film Company), or VFC, which produces made-for-television movies and miniseries. Shows may also include foreign serial melodramas dubbed in Vietnamese, shown on VTV1 or VTV3.

Aside from news and current affairs programming, VTV1 devotes itself to orchestral concerts, ballets, traditional theatre, ethnic minority culture shows and films.

On Vietnamese New Year's Eve, VTV broadcasts a block of specialised programmes, including Chiều cuối năm ("Last Afternoon of the Year"), a special edition of the 7pm news bulletin, satirical theatrical comedy Gặp nhau cuối năm ("Year-end meet"), dedicated music shows, and a live broadcast of New Year's Eve celebrations across the country.

VTV worldwide bureaux
As of 2020, VTV has 15 bureaux with stationed staff and correspondents at:

 Vientiane, Laos
 Phnom Penh, Cambodia
 Singapore, ASEAN region
 Beijing, China
 Tokyo, Japan
 Kuala Lumpur, Malaysia
 Jakarta, Indonesia
 Manila, Philippines
 Moscow, Russia
 Paris, France
 Seoul, South Korea
 Brussels, Belgium, Europe region
 London, United Kingdom, UK & Ireland area region
 Abu Dhabi, United Arab Emirates, Middle East region
 Washington, D.C., United States
 New York City, United States
 Los Angeles, United States

Criticism and controversies

Political
VTV4 has been criticized by South Vietnamese refugees and Vietnamese emigrants. This is because they do not like VTV supporting the Communist state.
This controversy was initiated in 2004, when the Australian public broadcaster SBS began to air news bulletin from VTV4 as a part of WorldWatch, a program which transmitting news program from public broadcasters around the world. VTV4's bulletin was quickly removed after the backlash. On the 2019 Lunar New Year edition of the cultural show Vietnamese Beauties, VTV used the figure of Trần Lệ Xuân, the former South Vietnamese First Lady to illustrate Vietnamese áo dài styles through the times. Two days later, on the variety show called 12 Zodiacs, VTV unintentionally displayed a frame showing a member of P336 band wearing a yellow jacket which resembled the South Vietnamese flag.

Copyright infringement
On 28 February 2016, VTV admitted that they had used copyrighted content without permission in some of its programs. Thus, VTV's YouTube channel was terminated. The case was exposed after Bui Minh Tuan, reported that VTV had repeatedly used his drone videos. He claimed that between 2015 and 2016 he had sent many complaints to VTV, the Department of Copyright and the Vietnam Ministry of Information and Communications to report around 20 copyright infringements by VTV, to no avail. Tuan decided to report the case to Google. In 2008, VTV lost its rights to broadcast the Miss World competition due to copyright issues. In 2016, it lost the broadcasting rights to the 2015-16 UEFA Champions League season.

Online broadcasts 
Sites such as https://vtvgo.vn/ show online live broadcasts of VTV channels. The VTV Go app is also available on Smart TV devices and smartphones.

See also
 List of television channels in Vietnam
 Television and mass media in Vietnam
 Culture of Vietnam
 Communications in Vietnam
 Media of Vietnam
 Ho Chi Minh City Television
 List of television programmes broadcast by Vietnam Television (VTV)
 List of dramas broadcast by Vietnam Television (VTV)

References

External links
  
 Official English Site
 List of television programmes broadcast by Vietnam Television (VTV)

 
Government of Vietnam
State media
Publicly funded broadcasters